The Armenian Observer is an English-language weekly Armenian publication based in Hollywood, California. It was founded in 1969 and published every Wednesday, with 50 issues per year. The owner and editor-in-chief is Professor Osheen Keshishian. The paper is available by subscription only and covers a vast variety of subjects and issues locally, nationally, internationally, the Armenian diaspora and Armenia. Very limited materials are also available online.

External links
Official website

Newspapers published in Greater Los Angeles
Armenian-American culture in Los Angeles
Publications established in 1969
1969 establishments in California
Weekly newspapers published in California